Pitcur is a hamlet at the eastern edge of Perth and Kinross, Scotland, about  southeast of Coupar Angus.

It is home to the ruined 16th-century Pitcur Castle. Pitcur is situated in a valley  to the north of Northballo Hill on the A923 road.

Notable people
Andrew Granger Heiton (1862–1927), architect

References

Villages in Perth and Kinross